Lao Customs is the customs service of Laos, with the responsibility of governing and overseeing the flow of goods, people and vehicles into and out of Laos; operating customs offices; and collecting import and export duty fees. The department advises businesses and travelers incountry and participates in regional and international customs-related associations and programs.

Organization
Lao Customs operates regional offices in many towns and cities, including offices located in: Attapeu, Bokeo, Bolikhamsai, Champassack, Huaphanh, Khammuane, Luang Namtha, Luang Prabang, Oudomxay, Phongsaly, Saravanne, Savannnakhet, Sekong, Vientiane Municipality, Vientiane Province, Xayaboury, Xaysomboune Special Zone and Xieng Khouang.

References

External links
 Lao PDR Customs Department official site

Government of Laos
Foreign relations of Laos
Customs services
Vientiane